Thanimai is a 2019 Indian Tamil-language drama film written and directed by S. Sivaraman. It stars Sonia Agarwal in the lead role with choreographer turned actor Sandy, Swaminathan and Ganja Karuppu in supporting roles. The film follows the life of a Sri Lankan refugee woman in Malaysia who returns to her home country in search of her long-lost daughter. Principal photography for Thanimai commenced during late 2018. The film is scheduled to release on 26 April 2019 as a lone release in Tamil for the week, coincidentally following the Easter Sunday bombings in Sri Lanka which happened on 21 April.

Synopsis 
The film traces the lonely journey of a Sri Lankan refugee who returns from Malaysia to India where she gave birth her child while taking shelter in India in 2009.

Cast 
 Sonia Agarwal as Yazhini
 Ganja Karuppu
 Sandy Master as Advocate Govindhan
 Swaminathan
 Mohan Raman
 Bonda Mani

Production 
The film is directed by lawyer turned filmmaker S. Sivaraman and marks his second directorial after Kaagitha Kappal. The first look poster of the film through Twitter was unveiled by Producer G.Dhananjayan on 8 January 2019. The official teaser of the film was unveiled on 8 March 2019 coinciding with the International Women's Day by actor Dhanush, a former brother-in-law of actress Sonia Agarwal. The film marks Sonia's first woman-centric lead role film in Tamil. Most of the portions of the film were shot in Rameswaram and in Chennai.

Soundtrack
Soundtrack was composed by Dhina.
"Enna Pannuna" – Dhina
"Nangala Gethu" – Gana Vinoth, Rap MC Vicky
"Veral Regai" – Chinmayi

References

External links 

 

2019 films
2010s Tamil-language films
2019 thriller drama films
Indian thriller drama films
Films shot in Chennai
Films set in Sri Lanka